is an autobiography written by Nunoe Mura and published in 2008. It details her life as the wife of the manga artist Shigeru Mizuki, especially their struggles against poverty before he became successful. It has sold over 500,000 copies.

In 2010, it was adapted into an Asadora television series starring Nao Matsushita, and a film starring Kazue Fukiishi.

Television series

Cast
Nao Matsushita as Fumie Murai
Osamu Mukai as Shigeru Murai
Takumi Saito

Film
Kazue Fukiishi as Nunoe Mura
Kankurō Kudō as Shigeru Mura
Maki Sakai

References

External links
TV drama official website 
Film official website  

2008 novels
2010 Japanese television series debuts
2010 Japanese television series endings
Asadora
Biographies adapted into films
Television shows based on books
GeGeGe no Kitarō